Lahlum is a surname. Notable people with the name include:

Dagmar Lahlum (1922–1999), Norwegian Resistance member and British spy
Hans Olav Lahlum (born 1973), Norwegian historian, writer, chess player, and politician

Norwegian-language surnames